Maojia (猫家 ) is a mixed language in Southern China. Maojiahua is an unclassified Sinitic language that has undergone influence from Hmongic languages.

Demographics
Maojiahua is spoken by about 200,000 people of Au-Ka (Aoka 奥卡) Miao ethnicity in Chengbu, Suining, Wugang and Suining in southwest part of Hunan Province, as well as in Ziyuan and Longsheng in north part of Guangxi Province.

According to Chen Qiguang (2013:32), "Maojia", also known as "Qingyi Miao 青衣苗", is spoken mostly in Chengbu County, Hunan, and also in Suining, Wugang, Longsheng, and Ziyuan counties. There is a total of about 120,000 speakers. The representative dialect given in Chen (2013) is that of Xintang Village 信塘村, Yangshi Township 羊石乡, Chengbu Miao Autonomous County, Hunan Province. Li (2004) covers various dialects of Qingyi Miao in detail.

Vocabulary
Below are selected words of likely non-Chinese origin from the Qingyi Miao dialect of Wutuan Town 五团镇, Chengbu County 城步县, Hunan (Li 2004).

References

Li, Lan 李藍. 2004. Hunan Chengbu Qingyi Miaoren hua 湖南城步靑衣苗人话 (The language of the Qingyi Miao people). Beijing: China Social Sciences Academy Press 中國社会科学出版社.
Ming studies, 34–35:55, University of Minnesota, 1995

Chinese-based pidgins and creoles
Languages of China
Mixed languages
Hmongic languages